Eoghan Ó Neachtain (24 October 1867 — 3 May 1957), Irish writer, fl. 1901–1932.

Ó Neachtain was born at Park, An Spidéal, in the late 19th century, and was a nationalist author associated with the Gaelic League and the Irish cultural revival. Almost all his published work was in the medium of the Irish language.

Bibliography
 Dubhaltach Mac Fhirbhisigh, maille le gluais agus focloir, 1902.
 I dtaoibh na hoibre, 1901.
 Stair-Cheachta, .i. scealta gearra ar neithibh agus ar dtaoinibh i Seanchas na hÉireann, I & II, 1905 and 1907.
 Scriobhnoiri na Gaedhilge, xiii, 1935.
 An Tiachog, n.d.
 Ceadtach Mac Fhinn as Eirinn. Sean-sgeal o Chois Fharraige, 1907.
 Ceimseata Euclid, book one, 1908.
 Irisleabhar an Mhistealaigh, 1911.
 Irisleabhar Priosuin, no, chuig bliadhna i priosunaibh na Breataine, 1910 and 1911.
 Stair Eamuinn Ui Chleire do reir Sheain Ui Neachtain, 1918.
 Unga, 1930.
 An Liudraman, 1932.
 Torolbh Mac Stairn do reir Mhicil Coimin, 1932.
 Tus na Ceimseatain, 1932.

References

 Galway Authors, Helen Maher, 1976.
 The Celebrated Antiquary, Nollaig Ó Muraíle, Maynooth, 1996.

People from County Galway
Irish-language writers
1867 births
1957 deaths